Kreenholm ( for crow islet) is a river island in Estonia, located in the Narva River, within the city limits of Narva.

The island divides the Narva Waterfall into eastern and western branches; the Estonia–Russia border runs through the eastern branch.

In the 14th century a sawmill was already operating on Kreenholm. In 1538 the Livonian Order built a watermill on the left bank of the river just opposite the island, and in 1823 a cloth factory operated by a local merchant, Paul Momma, was opened on the right bank of the Narva River. Baron Stieglitz's flax mill was located on the right bank. 

In 1856, Ludwig Knoop acquired the whole island and founded a textile factory there which was known as the Krenholm Manufacturing Company.

See also

References

Islands of Estonia
Narva
River islands of Estonia